Fort Frances High School is the only high school serving Fort Frances, Ontario. The school is administered by the Rainy River District School Board and serves roughly 475 students.

History
The original Fort Frances High School was located in downtown Fort Frances in what is now the Fort Frances Museum. A much larger high school was built on Second Street E. For a time, Fort Frances had two high schools: one for students in grade 9 (Westfort High) and the other for students in grades 10-13 (Fort Frances High School). The high school on Second Street was closed in 1999, with all students moving to a renovated Westfort High, then renamed to Fort Frances High School. The old high school has since been torn down.

In 2016, Fort Frances High School was opened to students in grades 7-8, known as "Fort Frances High School Intermediates." The students were moved from the adjacent elementary school, JW Walker, to alleviate overcrowding there and to boost attendance at FFHS.

Student activities

Fort Frances High School offers a wide variety of student activities and sports including:

Band & Choir
Best Buddies, where students with intellectual and physical disabilities can have a chance to have social interactions
Chess Club
Fiddle Club
First Responders, where students train to become the high school's "first responders" and respond to emergency situations
Musical & Musical Revue
Pottery Club
Prom Committee
Student Leadership Council
Theatre Technicians
Travel Club
Weight Club
Book Club
Yearbook
Yoga Club
Young Women's Conference

Sport Achievements
List of Fort Frances High School NorWOSSA championships:

Boys Curling 2011 : NorWossa Champions, NWOSAA Champions & OFSAA Silver Medalists. Team consisted of Skip : Isaac Keffer / Third : Cody Heyens / Second : Ian Grant / Lead : Jordan Sokoliuk & Alternate : Luke Esselink

Football Team 2019: WHSFL Division 3 Champions

References

External links
 Fort Frances High School Homepage

Fort Frances
Education in Rainy River District
Buildings and structures in Rainy River District
High schools in Ontario